The foreign relations of Albania are its relations with other governments and peoples. Foreign relations are conducted through the Ministry of Foreign Affairs in Tirana. The current minister is Olta Xhaçka. The current Ambassador to the United Nations is Ferit Hoxha.

Albania is a sovereign country in Southern Europe and the Mediterranean that declared its independence on 28 November 1912. Its foreign policy has maintained a policy of complementerianism by trying to have friendly relations with all countries. Since the collapse of Communism in 1990, Albania has extended its responsibilities and position in European and international affairs, supporting and establishing friendly relations with other nations around the world. 
 
The main factors defining Albanian foreign policy consist of geopolitical location, population, economic crisis, and ties with Albanian diaspora throughout the world. It also maintains strong diplomatic relations with the EU (primarily Croatia, France, Germany, Italy) Balkan countries (primarily Kosovo, Greece and North Macedonia), Arab world, Canada, China, Turkey, Israel, India, Japan, South Korea, Switzerland, UK and the United States.

The main objectives of the Albanian foreign policy are the accession of Albania to the European Union, the international recognition of Kosovo, the recognition of expulsion of Cham Albanians, helping and protecting the rights of Albanians in Montenegro, North Macedonia, Greece, Serbia, Italy, and the Albanian diaspora.

Albania was voted to become a member of the 15-country United Nations Security Council for a two-year term, 2022–23.

Overview 

The government of Albania was concerned with the developments in neighboring Kosovo, particularly in the post-Dayton agreement period. During the Kosovo War in 1999 as well as the ethnic cleansing of Kosovo Albanians by Serbs alongside the subsequent refugee influx into the country, Albania's status as an ally of the United States was confirmed. Albania emerged as being generally supportive of the United States. The support for the United States has remained high at 95% in Muslim majority (56% of the population) Albania in contrast to the rest of the Islamic world.

Balkans

Turkey 
During the post-cold war, geo-political complexities and conflicts in the Balkans, made Albania seek a protector power with Turkey, which is a NATO member. During the 1990s, state relations between Albania and Turkey were marked by high level visits, military agreements and the deployment of Turkish soldiers. An Albanian-Turkish military cooperation agreement was signed on 29 July 1992. The military agreement entailed education and training of personnel, bilateral cooperation in weapons production, joint military exercises, the exchange of military delegations and joint commissions on expanding further military ties into the future. The agreement also encompassed rebuilding Albania's Pasha Liman Base in the Bay of Vlorë on the Ionian sea by Turkey, in return for granting Turkey's access and use. Turkey has trained the Albanian Armed Forces, in particular officers and commando units. During civil war in 1997, Turkey alongside other countries, participated in Operation Alba by providing a brigade of 800 Turkish troops to restore order and its involvement served mainly as a stabilising force.

Turkey considers its friendship with Albania as important due to the context of state relations with Greece and through policy have exploited difficulties arising in Albanian-Greek relations. Having a powerful ally in Turkey has suited Albania at times regarding difficult interstate relations with Greece. Albania's emergence in the Balkans as a key NATO partner contributed to good and stronger Albanian-Turkish relations, in particular relating to military matters. The military alliance during the 1990s between Turkey and Albania was also aimed against Serbia in case a war over Kosovo had a wider regional spread. Greece has expressed concerns regarding Turkish relations with Albania and interpreted them as an anti-Greek measure to isolate Greece within the wider context of Albania being a potential outlet for expanding Muslim influence and Turkey allying with Muslim populations in the Balkans. Turkey on the other hand claimed Greece increased tensions within the region and conveyed concerns relating to Albanian and Greek polemics with Ankara expressing a partial bias on Albania's side angering the Greeks. Greece, aware of Albanian-Turkish military agreements denounced Turkey's interference in Greek affairs. Though not officially considered in Turkey as a rival within Albania, during the unrest of 1997 Greece was able to become an influential actor in Albania and the early period of the Kosovo crisis (1998-1999) when Albanian officials looked to Greece for assistance. The resumption of closer Albanian-Turkish relations ensured during the Kosovo crisis that made both countries act along the same policy lines toward Slobodan Milošević and the issue of Greater Serbia.

Turkey supported Albania's membership to become part of NATO. Military cooperation between Albania and Turkey is viewed by NATO as a stabilising factor within the volatile region of the Balkans. Albania has come to depend heavily on Turkish assistance and a high amount of military security. Turkey remains for Albania an important military ally alongside the U.S. Through its military personnel Turkey continues to train Albanian armed forces and also to provide assistance in logistics and modernisation efforts of the Albanian military. Radar systems for the surveillance of Albanian airspace in addition to telecommunication equipment have been supplied by Turkey to Albania. Albania receives Turkish assistance for police training. Turkey has continuously supported Albania from the 1990s on EU related matters as both countries view EU membership as an eventual final goal and common objective. State relations of Albania with Turkey are friendly and close, due to maintenance of close links with the Albanian diaspora in Turkey and strong Turkish sociopolitical, cultural, economic and military ties with Albania. Turkey has been supportive of Albanian geopolitical interests within the Balkans. In Gallup polls conducted in recent times Turkey is viewed as a friendly country by 73% of people in Albania. Albania has established political and economic ties with Arab countries, in particular with Arab Persian Gulf states who have heavily invested in religious, transport and other infrastructure alongside other facets of the economy in addition to the somewhat limited societal links they share. Albania is also working to develop social-political and economic ties with Israel.

Greece 
After the fall of the Albanian communist regime in 1991, relations between Greece and Albania became increasingly strained because of widespread allegations of mistreatment by Albanian authorities of the Greek ethnic minority in southern Albania and of mistreatment the Albanian communities in northern Greece. A wave of Albanian illegal economic migrants to Greece exacerbated tensions. The crisis in Greek–Albanian relations reached its peak in late August 1994, when an Albanian court sentenced five members (a sixth member was added later) of the ethnic Greek political party Omonia to prison terms on charges of undermining the Albanian state. Greece responded by freezing all EU aid to Albania, and sealing its border with Albania. In December 1994, however, Greece began to permit limited EU aid to Albania, while Albania released two of the Omonia defendants and reduced the sentences of the remaining four. 

There are still other impending issues in the relations between the two countries, regarding many Albanian workers in Greece who have not received legal papers despite promises by the Greek government. In 1996, the two countries signed a Treaty of Peace and Friendship and discussed the issues of the status of Albanian refugees in Greece and education in the mother tongue for the ethnic Greek minority in southern Albania. In the 1990s, Greece preferred and assisted Fatos Nano as Albanian leader due to him being Orthodox over Sali Berisha a Muslim, as Nano was seen as being friendlier to Greek interests. The government of Fatos Nano was viewed by Turkey as having a pro-Greek orientation and expressed some dissatisfaction though during that time still maintained close military relations with Albania in rebuilding its armed forces and a military base.

Today, as result of very frequent high-level contacts between the governments and the parliaments, relations between the two countries are regarded as excellent. Greece is a staunch supporter of the Euro-Atlantic integration of the Republic of Albania. Since Albania's NATO entry in May 2009, Albanian-Greek relations have been developing on all fronts, and especially after the election victory of Edi Rama in 2013, with the Albanian Chief of Foreign Policy, Ralf Gjoni, describing the diplomatic relations between two countries as "excellent". Greece today is Albania's most important European Union ally and NATO partner. At the Albanian government's request, about 250 Greek military personnel are stationed in Albania to assist with the training and restructuring of the Albanian Armed Forces, as part of the NATO programme. Big projects currently in running between the two countries include the touristic development of the Ionian coastline shared between the two countries, and the Trans Adriatic Pipeline (TAP), which helped boosting the relations of the two countries even further.

Albania's ties with Greece are also based on cultural and historic relations of the two peoples, including migration and national minorities. In addition, since Albania's transition to democracy, Greece has become a major financial partner of the country with Albania's economy being heavily reliant on investments from Greece. Culturally, the two nations' populations, whilst having a tense history, share numerous cultural and historic traits that have been used to boost the political relations of the neighbouring countries.

There had been numerous discussions, research and attempts by Albanians and Greeks to form a confederation during the Ottoman period. In the 19th century there were plans to create a Greek-Albanian confederation, which was revived from the earlier 18th century plans. In 1907 a special protocol and memorandum of understanding was signed by Neoklis Kazazis and Ismail Qemali, the first Prime Minister of Albania. Furthermore, Arvanite author Aristides Kollias in his book "The proclamation of the Association of Arvanites" states "from 1881 to 1907 we have sustained efforts and repeated consultations between Greeks and Albanians to create a Greek-Albanian state." In addition, Thanos Paleologos-Anagnostopoulos in his book "Greece and Albania in the early 20th century (1995)" stated that Ismail Qemali, a philhellene, worked with numerous Greek politicians and lobbyists, including Arvanite leaders, on a possible Greek-Albanian federation, one that "maintains national and religious independence of the two peoples." Likewise, Neoklis Kazazis saw this as a way of Greece quashing Italian influence in the region.

International 

Albania was voted to become a member of the 15-country UN Security Council for a two-year term, in 2022–23, on June 11, 2021. Former ambassador Kadare said that Albania's priorities in the Security Council will include a focus on women, peace, and security, promoting human rights and international law, preventing conflicts, protecting civilians, countering violent extremism, addressing climate change and its links to security, and strengthening multilateralism and the rules-based international order. She tweeted thanks to all countries that: "entrusted us with this huge responsibility".

Disputes 

The Albanian government supports the protection of the rights of ethnic Albanians outside of its borders but has downplayed them to further its primary foreign policy goal of regional cooperation; Albanian majority in Kosovo seeks full recognition of the declared independence from Serbia; Albanians in the Republic of Macedonia claim discrimination in education, access to public-sector jobs, and representation in government. A handful of Albanian troops have participated in the U.S.-led military operations in Iraq and Afghanistan. Albanian policy is very favorable to that of the United States and European Union.

The $30 million Albanian-American Enterprise Fund (AAEF), launched in 1994, is actively making debt and equity investments in local businesses. AAEF is designed to harness private sector efforts to assist in the economic transformation. U.S. assistance priorities include promotion of agricultural development and a market economy, advancement of democratic institutions (including police training), and improvements in quality of life.

List of countries 
, Albania maintains diplomatic relations with 170 sovereign entities:

Other countries which Albania has diplomatic relations are Mauritius and Uganda (established after 2008).

In 2008 and 2009, the Albanian Parliament ordered the Foreign Ministry to establish diplomatic relations with countries which Albania did not maintain diplomatic relations with, namely Antigua and Barbuda, Bahamas, Belize, Chad, Comoros, Democratic Republic of the Congo, Dominica, East Timor, Eswatini, Federated States of Micronesia, Fiji, Gambia, Grenada, Kiribati, Liberia, Marshall Islands, Palau, Saint Kitts and Nevis, Saint Lucia, Saint Vincent and the Grenadines, Samoa, Solomon Islands, Suriname, Rwanda, Tonga, Trinidad and Tobago, Tuvalu, Uganda and Vanuatu.

Diplomatic relations were suspended with Iran on 7 September 2022.

Organizations 
Albania maintains very good relations with the European Union, since 2014 is an official candidate

Albania is member in these international organizations:

AC, APF, BIE, BSEC, CEB, CoBx, CoE, CERN (Non-Member State), CEI, CCC, CEFTA, ECE, EAPC, EBRD, EITI, ECAA, ECAC, EC, ENTSO-E, Eurocontrol, FAO, FIUs, IAEA, IAO, IBRD, ICAO, ICCt, ICC, ICRC, ICRM, ICCROM, IDA, IDB, IHO, IFAD, IFC, IFRCS, ILO, IMF, IMO, Interpol, IOC, IPU, IOM, ISO, ITU, ITUC, MIGA, NATO, OAS, OB, OIC, OIF, OPCW, OSCE, OTIF, PCA, SEECP, SECI, SETC, UN, UNCTAD, UNDP, UNDSS, UNESCO, UNFPA, UNHCR, UNW, UNIDO, UNWTO, UPU, UfM, VC, WB, WCO, WFTU, WHO, WIPO, WMO and WTO.

Diplomatic relations

Africa

Americas

Asia

Europe

Oceania

Former countries

Multilateral

See also 

List of diplomatic missions in Albania
List of diplomatic missions of Albania
Visa requirements for Albanian citizens

References

External links 
 Ministry of Foreign Affairs (official site)

United Kingdom
 FCO Profile
 Estonian
 Estonian Ministry of Foreign Affairs about relations with Albania
  Estonian embassy in Athens is also accredited to Albania
Croatia
 Croatian Ministry of Foreign Affairs: list of bilateral treaties with Albania
Kosovo
 Albanian Ministry of Foreign Affairs
Turkey
 Albanian embassies in Turkey
 Turkish embassy in Albania
 Turkish Ministry of Foreign Affairs about relations with Albania
Russia
Embassy of the Russian federation in Tirana
Analysis
 Is there an Albanian question? , Chaillot Paper No. 107, February 2008, European Union Institute for Security Studies

 
Politics of Albania